Gona may refer to:

People
 Gona Budda Reddy
 Gona Ganna Reddy
 Marigona Dragusha, Kosovar model

Places
 Gona, Ethiopia
 Gona, Papua New Guinea
 Gona Barracks, Australia